Salaš or szállás is a type of farm in the Pannonian region (Hungary, Croatia, Czech Republic, Slovakia, Serbia).

Salaš may also refer to:
 Salaš (Zaječar), village in Serbia
 Salaš (Uherské Hradiště District), village and municipality in the Czech Republic
 Salaš Noćajski, village in Serbia
 Salaš Crnobarski, village in Serbia